There have been two baronetcies created for persons with the surname Mackworth, one in the Baronetage of England and one in the Baronetage of Great Britain. One creation is extant as of 2008.

The Mackworth Baronetcy, of Normanton in the County of Rutland, was created in the Baronetage of England on 4 June 1619 for Thomas Mackworth, Sheriff of Rutland in 1599 and 1609. The third Baronet represented Rutland in the House of Commons. The fourth Baronet sat as Member of Parliament for Rutland and Portsmouth. The title became extinct on the death of the seventh Baronet in 1803.

The Mackworth Baronetcy, of The Gnoll in the County of Glamorgan, was created in the Baronetage of Great Britain on 16 September 1776 for Herbert Mackworth, Member of Parliament for Cardiff for many years. His father, Herbert Mackworth, also represented this constituency in the House of Commons while his grandfather, Humphrey Mackworth, was Member of Parliament for Cardiganshire. The eighth Baronet was a colonel in the Royal Corps of Signals.

Two other members of the family have also gained distinction. Philip Herbert Mackworth (1897–1958), great-grandson of Herbert Mackworth, second son of the third Baronet, was an air vice-marshal in the Royal Air Force. Geoffrey Mackworth, fifth son of the sixth Baronet, was a vice-admiral in the Royal Navy.

Mackworth baronets, of Normanton (1619)

Sir Thomas Mackworth, 1st Baronet (died 1626)
Sir Henry Mackworth, 2nd Baronet (died 1640)
Sir Thomas Mackworth, 3rd Baronet (1624–1694)
Sir Thomas Mackworth, 4th Baronet (died Feb 1745) (buried in Old St. Pancras)
Sir Thomas Mackworth, 5th Baronet (died 1769)
Sir Henry Mackworth, 6th Baronet (died 1774)
Sir Henry Mackworth, 7th Baronet (c. 1728–1803)

Mackworth baronets, of The Gnoll (1776)

Sir Herbert Mackworth, 1st Baronet (1737–1791)
Sir Robert Humphrey Mackworth, 2nd Baronet (1764–1795)
Sir Digby Mackworth, 3rd Baronet (1766–1838), of Glen Usk, Monmouthshire
Sir Digby Mackworth, 4th Baronet (1789–1852)
Sir Digby Francis Mackworth, 5th Baronet (1817–1857)
Sir Arthur William Mackworth, 6th Baronet (1842–1914)
Sir Humphrey Mackworth, 7th Baronet (1871–1948)
Sir Harry Llewellyn Mackworth, 8th Baronet (1878–1952)
Sir David Arthur Geoffrey Mackworth, 9th Baronet (1912–1998)
Sir Digby John Mackworth, 10th Baronet (1945–2018)
Sir Alan Keith Mackworth, 11th Baronet (born 1945)
The heir presumptive is Hugh Francis Mackworth (born 1958), brother of the 11th Baronet.
His heir is Alexander Hugh Mackworth (born 2000), only son of the heir presumptive

See also
Mackworth-Praed baronets

Notes

References 

History of the Cardiff constituency

Mackworth
Extinct baronetcies in the Baronetage of England
1619 establishments in England
1776 establishments in Great Britain